Jan Marinus Wiersma (born 26 August 1951 in Groningen) is a Dutch politician and from 1994 to 2009 Member of the European Parliament. He is a member of the Labour Party, vice-chair of the Party of European Socialists group, and sits on the European Parliament's Committee on Foreign Affairs.

He was also a member of the Subcommittee on Security and Defence, a substitute for the Committee on Transport and Tourism, a member of the delegation to the EU–Romania Joint Parliamentary Committee, and a member of the delegation to the EU–Moldova Parliamentary Cooperation Committee.

Career
 Higher degree in history (Groningen State University, 1978)
 Researcher on Foreign Affairs and Defence for the parliamentary PvdA group in the Second Chamber (1978–1987)
 International Secretary and second Vice-Chairman of the PvdA (1987–1999)
 Member of the European Parliament (1994–2009)
 Vice-Chairman of the PSE Group (1999–2004)
 Member of the PSE bureau (since 2004)
 Member of the Steering Committee of the European Forum for Democracy and Solidarity

External links
 Official website Wiersma
 European Parliament biography
 Declaration of financial interests (in Dutch; PDF file)

1951 births
Living people
Dutch male writers
Politicians from Groningen (city)
University of Groningen alumni
Labour Party (Netherlands) MEPs
MEPs for the Netherlands 1994–1999
MEPs for the Netherlands 1999–2004
MEPs for the Netherlands 2004–2009